Harry Francis "Junior" Herndon (born September 11, 1978) is a former Major League Baseball player who pitched for the San Diego Padres. In his career, he had a win-loss record of 2-6. He pitched 42.2 innings in 12 appearances while in the majors.

References

External links

1978 births
Living people
San Diego Padres players
Baseball players from Kansas
Major League Baseball pitchers
Arizona League Padres players
Idaho Falls Braves players
Rancho Cucamonga Quakes players
Clinton LumberKings players
Mobile BayBears players
Las Vegas Stars (baseball) players
Portland Beavers players
Portland Sea Dogs players
Wichita Wranglers players
People from Liberal, Kansas
People from Moffat County, Colorado